Mohansinh Rathva (born April 4, 1944) is an Indian politician and a Member of the Legislative Assembly of Gujarat from Chhota Udaipur constituency. He has served as an MLA for ten terms.

He was a member of Gujarat legislative assembly representing Jetpur constituency in 1972-74 and 1975-80 as a Indian National Congress (Organisation) (NCO) member, in 1980-85 and 1985-90 as a member of Janata Party, in 1990-95 as a member of Janata Dal, and in 1995-98, 1998-2002 and 2007-12 as member of Indian National Congress (INC). Later he represented Chhota Udaipur constituency in 2012-17 and 2017-22 as INC member. He joined BJP along with his son on 8 November 2022.

References 

Living people
1944 births
People from Chhota Udaipur district
Indian National Congress politicians from Gujarat
Bharatiya Janata Party politicians from Gujarat
Gujarat MLAs 1972–1974
Gujarat MLAs 1975–1980
Gujarat MLAs 1980–1985
Gujarat MLAs 1985–1990
Gujarat MLAs 1990–1995
Gujarat MLAs 1995–1998
Gujarat MLAs 1998–2002
Gujarat MLAs 2007–2012
Gujarat MLAs 2012–2017
Gujarat MLAs 2017–2022